Federal-American National Bank is an historic structure located in Downtown Washington, D.C.  It was listed on the National Register of Historic Places in 1994.

History
The bank was formed as a merger between two other banks in 1923.  Hamilton National Bank inhabited the building after the banking crisis of 1933. More recently it housed the National Bank of Washington.

Architecture
Architects Alfred C. Bossom and Jules Henri de Sibour designed the building.  The exterior of the structure is covered in limestone and features a Classical Revival facade, large arched windows, engaged columns and sculptural embellishment.  The interior features a bronze vestibule and a Renaissance Revival banking room with a marble entrance stair, mezzanine, elaborate polychrome coffered ceiling, chandeliers, ornamentation in classical motifs, and innovative open counter design  The building is somewhat unusual in that the main banking room is on a raised main floor and storefronts on the ground level.

References

External links

Commercial buildings completed in 1926
1926 establishments in Washington, D.C.
Neoclassical architecture in Washington, D.C.
Bank buildings on the National Register of Historic Places in Washington, D.C.